The 2015–16 Northern Iowa Panthers women's basketball team will represent the University of Northern Iowa in the 2015–16 NCAA Division I women's basketball season. The Panthers, led by ninth year head coach Tanya Warren, played their home games at McLeod Center and are members of the Missouri Valley Conference. They finished the season 24–11, 15–3 in Missouri Valley League play to win the Missouri Valley Regular season title. They advanced to the semifinals of the Missouri Valley Tournament where they lost to Missouri State. They were invited to the Women's National Invitation Tournament where they defeated Nebraska and Drake in the first and second rounds before losing to South Dakota in the third round.

Roster

Schedule

|-
!colspan=9 style="background:#660099; color:#FFD700;"| Exhibition

|-
!colspan=9 style="background:#660099; color:#FFD700;"| Non-conference regular season

|-
!colspan=9 style="background:#660099; color:#FFD700;"| Missouri Valley Conference Regular season

|-
!colspan=9 style="background:#660099; color:#FFD700;"| Missouri Valley Tournament

|-
!colspan=9 style="background:#660099; color:#FFD700;"| WNIT

See also
2015–16 Northern Iowa Panthers men's basketball team

References

Northern Iowa Panthers women's basketball seasons
Northern Iowa
2016 Women's National Invitation Tournament participants
Panth
Panth